In geometry, the toothpick sequence is a sequence of 2-dimensional patterns which can be formed by repeatedly adding line segments ("toothpicks") to the previous pattern in the sequence.

The first stage of the design is a single "toothpick", or line segment. Each stage after the first is formed by taking the previous design and, for every exposed toothpick end, placing another toothpick centered at a right angle on that end.

The structure of stages in the toothpick sequence often resemble the T-square fractal, or the arrangement of cells in the Ulam–Warburton cellular automaton.

All of the bounded regions surrounded by toothpicks in the pattern, but not themselves crossed by toothpicks, must be squares or rectangles. It has been conjectured that every open rectangle in the toothpick pattern (that is, a rectangle that is completely surrounded by toothpicks, but has no toothpick crossing its interior) has side lengths and areas that are powers of two, with one of the side lengths being at most two.

References

External links
A list of integer sequences related to the Toothpick Sequence from the On-line Encyclopedia of Integer Sequences. (note: IDs such as A139250 are IDs within the OEIS, and descriptions of the sequences can be located by entering these IDs in the OEIS search page.)
Joshua Trees and Toothpicks, Brian Hayes, 8 February 2013

Cellular automaton patterns
Combinatorics